Ingrid Godon (born 29 August 1958) is a Flemish illustrator of children's literature.

Career 

She won the Prijs van de Kinder- en Jeugdjury voor het boek in Vlaanderen in 1988 and in 1989 for respectively illustrating the books Pius en Pepijn and Niemand mag het weten written by Gerda van Cleemput. She also won the award in 1988 for illustrating the book Mijn broer is een punker by Maria Heylen.

In 2001, Godon and André Sollie won the Gouden Griffel award for their book Wachten op Matroos (2000). She also won a Vlag en Wimpel award for her illustrations in the book. In Flanders the book was awarded the Boekenpauw and Boekenwelp awards. The English translation of the book Hello, Sailor was published in 2003. The book caused controversy in England as it was argued that its inclusion in school curricula effectively forced schools to include books with homosexual characters.

She also received a Boekenpauw award in 2015 for her illustrations in the book Ik denk written by Toon Tellegen. In 2009, she received a Boekenpluim award for illustrating the book Morgen was het feest, also written by Toon Tellegen.

Over the years Godon has illustrated over a hundred children's books for numerous authors.

Awards 

 1988: Prijs van de Kinder- en Jeugdjury voor het boek in Vlaanderen, Mijn broer is een punker
 1988: Prijs van de Kinder- en Jeugdjury voor het boek in Vlaanderen, Pius en Pepijn
 1989: Prijs van de Kinder- en Jeugdjury voor het boek in Vlaanderen, Niemand mag het weten
 2001: Boekenpauw, Wachten op Matroos
 2001: Boekenwelp, Wachten op Matroos
 2001: Vlag en Wimpel, Wachten op Matroos
 2001: Gouden Griffel, Wachten op Matroos (with André Sollie)
 2009: Boekenpluim, Morgen was het feest
 2015: Boekenpauw, Ik denk

References

External links 
 Ingrid Godon (in Dutch), Digital Library for Dutch Literature
 Ingrid Godon (in Dutch), jeugdliteratuur.org

1958 births
Living people
Belgian illustrators
Belgian women illustrators
Boekenpauw winners
Belgian children's book illustrators
Gouden Griffel winners
20th-century Belgian women
21st-century Belgian women